The 2016 Hungarian Grand Prix (formally known as the Formula 1 Magyar Nagydíj 2016) was a Formula One motor race that was held on 24 July 2016 at the Hungaroring in Mogyoród, Hungary. It was the eleventh round of the 2016 FIA Formula One World Championship and the 32nd running of the Hungarian Grand Prix, and 31st time it had been held as a round of the World Championship.

Mercedes driver Nico Rosberg entered the round with a one-point lead over teammate Lewis Hamilton in the Drivers' Championship while Mercedes led in the Constructors' Championship ahead of Ferrari. The race was won by Hamilton, with Rosberg and Daniel Ricciardo completing the podium, meaning Hamilton took over the lead in the Drivers' Championship after the race.

Report
In the week before the race, the FIA revised the rules governing pit-to-car communications following criticism from the teams in light of a penalty given to Nico Rosberg at the British Grand Prix for receiving assistance outside those allowed under the regulations; and in the aftermath of Sergio Pérez's brake failure and subsequent retirement from the Austrian Grand Prix, which Force India was particularly critical of in light of the safety implications arising from Pérez's accident. The rules, first introduced during the  season, were intended to crack down on driver coaching—stating that a competitor must drive the car "alone and unaided"—but allowing teams the scope to alert drivers to the imminent failure of components. Under the revisions introduced for the Hungarian Grand Prix, a car must pit or be retired immediately if an issue arises that is deemed serious enough to warrant intervention from the team. The revised regulations were poorly received, with Ferrari's Sebastian Vettel being particularly critical during interviews.

After introducing "baguette" kerbs at the Austrian Grand Prix as a means of policing track limits and prevent drivers from deliberately running wide to gain an advantage, the Hungarian Grand Prix saw the introduction of electronic monitoring at selected corners, with pressure-sensitive plates placed under kerbs to detect cars running wide, with the system tied to the car transponders to detect when a driver had run too wide.

Mixed conditions in the first qualifying session meant that a record eleven drivers failed to make the 107% time: Red Bull Racing's Max Verstappen and Daniel Ricciardo; Williams' Felipe Massa and Valtteri Bottas; Force India's Nico Hulkenberg and Sergio Pérez; Renault's Kevin Magnussen and Jolyon Palmer; Manor's Pascal Wehrlein and Rio Haryanto; and Sauber's Marcus Ericsson. Due to the exceptional circumstances, all eleven were permitted to start the race, and the fastest five - Ricciardo, Verstappen, Hulkenberg, Bottas, and Pérez - were allowed to proceed to Q2 as normal.

Lewis Hamilton took a comfortable win ahead of his teammate Rosberg, their only challenge came from Daniel Ricciardo who did threaten but ultimately faded away before finishing in 3rd place holding off a charge from Ferrari's Sebastian Vettel. Jenson Button was the only retirement from the race when he was instructed to stop after an oil leak in his McLaren in what he described as "A race from hell".

Classification

Qualifying

Notes:
 – Daniel Ricciardo, Max Verstappen, Nico Hülkenberg, Valtteri Bottas and Sergio Pérez all failed to set lap times within 107% of the fastest time set in Q1. However, they were allowed to advance to Q2 with their Q1 times intact.
 – Jolyon Palmer, Felipe Massa, Kevin Magnussen, Marcus Ericsson, Pascal Wehrlein and Rio Haryanto all failed to set lap times within 107% of the fastest time set in Q1. Their participation in the race was permitted at the discretion of the stewards.
 – Marcus Ericsson was required to start from the pit lane after getting a new survival cell.
 – Rio Haryanto received a five-place grid penalty for an unscheduled gearbox change.

Race

Notes
 – Esteban Gutiérrez originally finished 12th, but received a five-second time penalty after the race for ignoring blue flags.

Championship standings after the race

Drivers' Championship standings

Constructors' Championship standings

 Note: Only the top five positions are included for both sets of standings.

See also 
 2016 Hungaroring GP2 Series round
 2016 Hungaroring GP3 Series round

References

Hungarian
Grand Prix
Hungarian Grand Prix
Hungarian Grand Prix